The 2012–13 Boston College Eagles men's ice hockey team represented Boston College in the 2012–13 NCAA Division I men's ice hockey season. The team was coached by Jerry York, his nineteenth season behind the bench at Boston College.  The Eagles play their home games at Kelley Rink on the campus of Boston College, competing in Hockey East.

BC competed in two in-season tournaments during the 2012–13 season.  In December, the Eagles participated in the Mariucci Classic hosted by Minnesota in Minneapolis, losing to host Minnesota in the championship match.  BC also competed in the 61st annual Beanpot tournament alongside Boston-area schools Boston University, Harvard, and Northeastern, at TD Garden, defeating Northeastern in the championship to capture their fourth consecutive title.

Despite a strong 22–12–4 record and 15–9–3 in conference play, one point short of the regular season title, the Eagles did not fare well in the postseason. Following a semifinal loss to Boston University in the Hockey East tournament, the Eagles fell to Union College in the first round of NCAA Tournament. However, a few bright spots of the season included sophomore Johnny Gaudreau being a Hobey Baker award finalist after helping the US National Junior team to win a gold medal at the 2013 World Junior Championship in Ufa, Russia, as well as Head Coach Jerry York became the winningest head coach in NCAA Hockey history, passing Ron Mason, with his 925th win over Alabama-Huntsville in the 2012 Mariucci Classic.

Previous season recap

The Eagles entered the season as the defending national champions, having won the program's fifth NCAA title by defeating Ferris State in the championship game of the 2012 NCAA Tournament.  BC also enters the 2012–13 season as defending Hockey East tournament and regular season champions, defeating Maine in the 2012 Hockey East Tournament final and finishing ahead of Boston University and UMass Lowell in the final Hockey East regular season standings.  BC also retained the Beanpot in 2012, their third title in a row, by defeating Boston University in overtime of the championship game.  The Eagles raised their 2012 National Championship banner to the Conte Forum rafters in their home-opener against Northeastern on October 20, 2012, a 3-0 victory.

Offseason

April 10, 2012: Juniors Chris Kreider and Brian Dumoulin decided to forgo their senior seasons to pursue professional careers.  Kreider joined the New York Rangers, who drafted the forward in the first round of the 2009 NHL Entry Draft, making his debut for the Rangers during the 2012 Stanley Cup Playoffs.  Dumoulin joined with the Carolina Hurricanes organization, who had drafted him in the second round of the 2009 NHL Entry Draft.  He was then traded to the Pittsburgh Penguins in the deal for Jordan Staal.

May 15, 2012: Boston College received an anonymous gift of $5 million to endow the men's ice hockey coaching position, the largest gift ever made in support of a BC athletics team.

May 16, 2012: The national championship team was honored in Boston at Boston City Hall and the Massachusetts State House.  The Eagles presented Massachusetts governor Deval Patrick with a commemorative hockey jersey.

September 20, 2012: Assistant Coach Greg Brown was promoted to Associated Head Coach.

Recruiting
Boston College adds six freshmen for the 2012-13 season: defenseman Colin Sullivan, a seventh round draft pick of the Montreal Canadiens in the 2011 NHL Entry Draft; defenseman Teddy Doherty, one of three current Eagles who played for Dubuque of the USHL; defenseman Michael Matheson, a first round pick of the Florida Panthers in the 2012 NHL Entry Draft; defenseman Travis Jeke, one of three players for Boston College from Pittsburgh; forward Brendan Silk, a product of the USA Hockey National Team Development Program; and forward Peter McMullen, who earned New Jersey Star Ledger All-State honors in 2010-11 after leading Delbarton Prep in scoring.  A seventh recruit, forward Frank Vatrano, withdrew from the University in later September 2012.

2012–2013 roster

Departures from 2011–2012 team
 Barry Almeida, F – graduation
 Tommy Atkinson, F – graduation
 Paul Carey, F – graduation
 Tommy Cross, D – graduation
 Edwin Shea, D – graduation
 Chris Venti, G – graduation
 Chris Kreider, F – signed with New York Rangers
 Brian Dumoulin, D – signed with Carolina Hurricanes, then traded to Pittsburgh Penguins
 Mark Begert, D – left team

2012–13 Eagles

As of September 26, 2012.

Coaching staff

Standings
On September 25, 2012, BC was picked to finish first in the preseason Hockey East coaches poll.

Schedule

2012–2013 regular season

All times Eastern

Rankings from USCHO.com/CBS College Sports Poll

* = Hockey East Conference Play

Marriucci Classic = 22nd Annual Mariucci Classic in Minneapolis, MN

Beanpot = 61st Annual Beanpot Tournament in Boston, MA

On December 1, the Eagles defeated rivals Boston University 5-2 to secure Jerry York's 924th career coaching victory, tying Ron Mason as college hockey's all-time wins leader.
On December 4, sophomore forward Johnny Gaudreau was named to the United States National Junior Team preliminary roster.
On December 28, sophomore forward Johnny Gaudreau was included in the final roster for the United States National Junior Team to compete at the 2013 World Junior Ice Hockey Championship in Ufa, Russia.
On December 29, Boston College defeated Alabama Huntsville in the first round of the Mariucci Classic, securing head coach Jerry York's record 925 career coaching victory, surpassing Ron Mason as the new all-time wins leader in college hockey.
On January 5, sophomore forward Johnny Gaudreau and the United States National Junior Team defeated Sweden 3-1 to capture gold at the 2013 World Junior Ice_Hockey Championship.  Gaudreau led the tournament with seven goals.
Head coach Jerry York missed the New Hampshire series on January 11 and 12 and games against Massachusetts and Northeastern on January 18 and 19 due to outpatient eye surgery.  A celebration to honor Coach York on becoming the all-time career wins leader which was scheduled for January 18 was postponed.
On February 11, Boston College defeated Northeastern 6-3 in the Beanpot tournament to win their fourth straight Beanpot title and 18th all-time.

2013 post-season

All times Eastern

In the 2012-13 Hockey East Tournament, the Eagles swept the Vermont Catamounts in the best of 3 round (scores of 4-2, and 4-1), but fell to arch-rival Boston University in the semi-finals by a score of 6-3. For the senior class, it was the first loss at their "home away from home", the TD Garden, having previously won the three previous Hockey East tournaments and the four previous Beanpot tournaments. BU went on to face UMass Lowell in the title game, losing 1-0 to the Riverhawks, who captured their first Hockey East Title.
The Eagles fell in the first round of the NCAA Tournament to the Union Dutchmen, by a score of 5-1. This was the first ever meeting between the two schools. It was also the final game for the following BC seniors: forwards Steven Whitney, Brooks Dyroff, captain Pat Mullane, defensemen Patrick Wey, Patch Alber, and goaltender Parker Milner. The Dutchmen went on to face Quinnipiac in the Regional Final, losing to the Bobcats by a score of 5-1.
On April 2, rising-senior Patrick Brown (forward) was named the 2013-14 season Captain, and rising-seniors Bill Arnold (forward) and Isaac Macleod (defense) were named Assistant Captains.
On April 3, Johnny Gaudreau was announced as one of the three Hobey Baker Hat-Trick Finalists for the 2012-13 season.

Statistics

Skaters

Goaltenders

Awards and honors

Hobey Baker Hat-Trick Finalist
Johnny Gaudreau, F - 2012-13

ACHA Division I - All Americans
Johnny Gaudreau - First Team
Steven Whitney - First Team

Hockey East Player of the Year
Johnny Gaudreau, F - 2012-13

Hockey East All-Stars
Johnny Gaudreau, F - All-First Team 
Steven Whitney, F - All-First Team 
Patrick Wey, D - All-Second Team 
Michael Matheson, D - All-Rookie Team 

Hockey East Awards
Patrick Wey, D - 'Old Time Hockey' Best Defensive Defensman 
Johnny Gaudreau, F - 'Turfer Athletic' Scoring Champion, 36 Points 

New England D-I Men's Hockey All Stars & Awards
Johnny Gaudreau, F - All Star, Leonard Fowle Award - Most Valuable Player, Herb Gallaher Award - Best Forward
Steven Whitney, F - All Star
Michael Matheson, D - All Star

Hockey East Player of the Month
Pat Mullane, F - Month of October 2012
Johnny Gaudreau, F - Month of November 2012

Hockey East Team of the Week
Week of October 22, 2012
Week of October 29, 2012
Week of November 12, 2012

Hockey East Player of the Week
Johnny Gaudreau, F - Week of October 22, 2012, Week of November 12, 2012, Week of March 11, 2013
Parker Milner, G - Week of October 29, 2012 (shared with Mike Collins, F, Merrimack)
Steven Whitney, F - Week of January 21, 2013 (shared with Branden Gracel, F, Massachusetts)

Hockey East Defensive Player of the Week
Parker Milner, G - Week of November 12, 2012, Week of January 14, 2013, Week of February 25, 2013

Hockey East Rookie of the Week
Michael Matheson, D - Week of December 10, 2012 (shared with Nick Saracino, G, Providence)

Beanpot - Eberly Award
Parker Milner, G 

61st Walter Brown Award
Steven Whitney, F 

AHCA Terry Flanagan Award
Mike Cavanaugh, Associate Head Coach

References

External links
BC Men's Hockey Home Page
BC Men's Hockey Page on USCHO

Boston College Eagles men's ice hockey seasons
Boston College Eagles
Boston College Eagles
Boston College Eagles men's ice hockey season
Boston College Eagles men's ice hockey season
Boston College Eagles men's ice hockey season
Boston College Eagles men's ice hockey season